Diamond River may refer to:

 Diamond Brook
 Geum River

See also
Not to be confused with
 Little Diamond Brook
 Swift Diamond River
 Dead Diamond River
 East Branch Dead Diamond River
 Middle Branch Dead Diamond River
 West Branch Dead Diamond River
 Little Dead Diamond River
 West Branch Little Dead Diamond River
 South Branch Little Dead Diamond River